The strip steak (sirloin in Britain, Australia, and South Africa) is a cut of beef steaks from the short loin of a cow. It consists of a muscle that does little work, the longissimus, making the meat particularly tender, although not as tender as the nearby psoas major or tenderloin. Unlike the tenderloin, the longissimus is a sizable muscle, allowing it to be cut into larger portions.

Other names

According to the National Cattlemen's Beef Association, the steak is marketed in the United States under various names, including Ambassador Steak, Boneless Club Steak, Hotel-Style Steak, Kansas City Steak, Top Loin, Veiny Steak, and New York Steak. Delmonico's Restaurant, an operation opened in New York City in 1827, offered as one of its signature dishes a cut from the short loin called a Delmonico steak. Due to its association with the city, it is often referred to as a New York strip steak.

In New Zealand and Australia, it is known as porterhouse and sirloin (striploin steak) and is in the Handbook of Australian Meat under codes 2140 to 2143. In the UK it is called sirloin, and in Ireland it is called striploin.

In Canada, most meat purveyors refer to this cut as a strip loin; in French it is known as contre-filet.

Related cuts
When still attached to the bone, and with a piece of the tenderloin also included, the strip steak becomes a T-bone steak or a porterhouse steak, the difference being that the porterhouse is cut from further rear and thus has a larger portion of tenderloin included. The strip steak may be sold with or without the bone. Strip steaks may be substituted for most recipes calling for T-bone and porterhouse steaks, and sometimes for fillet and rib eye steaks.

A bone-in strip steak with no tenderloin attached is sometimes referred to as a shell steak.

See also
 
 British and American cuts of beef
 Entrecôte

References

Cuts of beef
Steak